Cuci (Malay: "Wash") is a 2008 Malaysian comedy film directed by actor Hans Isaac. The film was released on 28 January 2008.

Plot
The story is about four brothers who are window washers from Kuala Selangor who strive for something more in their lives. They find out the existence of a Window Washing Olympics with the grand prize of a contract to wash the Petronas Towers in Kuala Lumpur. As they fight through the Olympics along with other more organised and professional teams, they realise that nothing is more important than their brotherhood and friendship.

Cast
 Awie
 Afdlin Shauki
 AC Mizal
 Hans Isaac
 Erra Fazira
 Umie Aida
 Rahim Razali
 Yusni Jaafar
 Harith Iskander
 Harun Salim Bachik

Reception
The film performed well at the box office, being second in Malaysia behind John Rambo.

References

External links 
 

2008 films
Malaysian comedy films
2008 comedy films
Malay-language films
Grand Brilliance films